Tokyo Joe is a song by Bryan Ferry, the lead vocalist for Roxy Music. It was released as the second single from his fourth solo studio album and the first consisting entirely of original songs, In Your Mind, in May 1977, being Ferry's eleventh single. The single features the non-album track, "She's Leaving Home" as the B-side, which was originally recorded for the Beatles tribute album All This and World War II (1976).

Background
"Tokyo Joe", is about Ferry's fascination with cinema, it celebrates 'femme-fatale', inspired by the song "Shanghai Lil" sung by James Cagney in the Hollywood musical, Shanghai Express released in 1932.

Personnel
 Bryan Ferry – lead vocals, keyboards
 Chris Spedding – lead guitar
 Paul Thompson – drums
 John Wetton – bass guitar
 David Skinner – piano, keyboards
 Ann O'Dell – strings arrangements

Certifications

References

External links
 

1977 songs
1977 singles
Bryan Ferry songs
Songs written by Bryan Ferry
Polydor Records singles